The women's 200 metre freestyle competition of the 2014 FINA World Swimming Championships (25 m) was held on 7 December.

Records
Prior to the competition, the existing world and championship records were as follows.

The following records were established during the competition:

Results

Heats
The heats were held at 10:49.

Final
The final was held at 20:01.

References

Women's 200 m freestlye
2014 in women's swimming